The Departmental Council of Calvados is the deliberative assembly of the Calvados department in the region of Normandy. It consists of 50 members (general councilors) from 25 cantons and its headquarters are in Caen, capital of the department.

The President of the General Council is Jean-Léonce Dupont.

Vice-Presidents 
The President of the Departmental Council is assisted by 15 vice-presidents chosen from among the departmental advisers. Each of them has a delegation of authority.

References

See also 

 Calvados
 General councils of France
 Departmental Council of Calvados(official website)

Calvados
Calvados (department)